Quantum is a color vector arcade video game developed at General Computer Corporation for Atari, Inc. and released in December 1982. It was designed by Betty Ryan who was the first female developer at GCC. The premise of the game is related loosely to quantum physics; the player directs a probe with a trackball to encircle atomic "particles" for points, without touching various other particles. Once the particles are  surrounded by the probe's tail they are destroyed.

Gameplay

High score table

To enter initials for a high score, the player uses the trackball to circle letters in the same fashion used during gameplay. If the player achieves the highest score on the table, the initials screen is preceded by another on which adept players can use the trackball to draw their initials.

Legacy
A screenshot of a clone called Tachyon was previewed in Atari 8-bit family magazine ANALOG Computing, but the game was never completed.

See also
Disco No. 1
Libble Rabble

References

External links

Quantum at Arcade History

1982 video games
Arcade video games
Arcade-only video games
Atari arcade games
Drawing video games
Trackball video games
Vector arcade video games
Video games about microbes
Video games about nuclear technology
Video games developed in the United States